Sargus bipunctatus, the twin-spot centurion, is a European species of soldier fly.

Description
Body length  10 to 14 mm. Frons less broad than in Sargus cuprarius. The mesonotum is metallic green; the abdomen brown, with a violet metallic tinge. Females have a broader build than the slender males with the base of the abdomen extensively reddish and a blackish tip bearing blue reflections. Wings slightly yellow. Red legs, tarsi brown at the apex.
<ref>Seguy. E. Faune de France Faune n° 13 1926. Diptères Brachycères.308 p., 685 fig.</ref>E. P. 
Narchuk in Bei-Bienko, G. Ya, 1988 Keys to the insects of the European Part of the USSR Volume 5 (Diptera) Part 2 English 
edition. Keys to Palaearctic species but now needs revision.

Biology
Found in open and wooded habitats, sunbathing on foliage in sheltered spots. The flight period is from July to November. Females lay eggs on fresh dung, manure or in close by soil where the larvae develop. The larvae have been reared from cow dung, compost, rotting vegetation and decaying fungi. Larvae have been found in egg pods of locusts (Dociostaurus maroccanus'' Shnb.).

Distribution
Trans-Caucasus Central belt and South of Western Europe.

References

External links

Images representing  Sargus bipunctatus at Bold

Stratiomyidae
Diptera of Europe
Insects described in 1763
Taxa named by Giovanni Antonio Scopoli